Turpeinen is a Finnish surname. Notable people with the surname include:

 Pirkko Turpeinen (born 1940), Finnish psychiatrist and politician
 Aarno Turpeinen (born 1971), Finnish football player
 Viola Turpeinen, American-Finnish accordion player

Finnish-language surnames